No. 1435 Flight is a Typhoon FGR. 4 unit of the Royal Air Force, based at RAF Mount Pleasant, providing air defence for the Falkland Islands, South Georgia and the South Sandwich Islands. Permanently based in the islands, the aircrew and groundcrew from the UK are cycled through No. 1435 Flight, providing a 365-day, 24-hour alert.

During the Second World War, No. 1435 Flight was a night fighter unit on Malta, subsequently raised to squadron status, becoming the only RAF flying squadron to be given a four digit number.

History

Early years 

The Malta Night Fighter Unit (MNFU) was formed in late July 1941 at RAF Ta Kali on Malta, equipped with 12 Hawker Hurricane II fighters. The unit's Hurricanes usually operated in pairs in conjunction with searchlights. It claimed its first successes on the night of 5/6 August, when two Fiat BR 20Ms were shot down.
 
No. 1435 (Night Fighter) Flight was first formed at Malta as a night fighter unit on 4 December 1941, by re-designating the Malta Night Fighter Unit. The unit remained equipped with Hawker Hurricane II fighters, but now found that the Hurricane had difficulty in intercepting fast Junkers Ju 88s over Malta, and instead began to operate night intruder missions over Sicily to catch the enemy aircraft over their own airfields, fitting its Hurricanes with external fuel tanks to increase the aircraft's endurance. They were also used to drop supplies (and in particular money) to a British agent operating in Sicily. On 7 March the Flight was strengthened by the addition of four radar-equipped Bristol Beaufighter night fighters. 

The flight was reformed in July 1942 at RAF Luqa, Malta, as a day fighter unit equipped with Supermarine Spitfire, and manned by personnel from several squadrons, including Nos. 185, 249 and 603 Squadrons. After a brief period as No. 1435 (Fighter) Flight, at RAF Luqa, due to its size it was raised to No. 1435 Squadron on 2 August 1942 at RAF Luqa, Malta.

It converted to fighter-bomber activities in January 1943 and operated over Sicily and in Italy. It was assigned to the Balkan Air Force, carrying out operations over Albania and Yugoslavia until the end of the war.

It disbanded on 29 April 1945 at Falconara, Italy.

Falkland Islands

Following the Falklands War, the Flight provided an air defence unit at Stanley airfield. As this was badly damaged during the fighting the Flight reformed with Hawker Siddeley Harrier GR.3 aircraft in late 1983 and disbanding again in May 1985.

In November 1988, when No. 23(F) Squadron converted to the Panavia Tornado F3, No. 1435 Flight was revived, equipped with four McDonnell Douglas Phantom FGR.2s. After No. 23(F) Squadron's disbandment at RAF Mount Pleasant, the mission and equipment were transferred to No. 1435 Flight. The Phantoms were replaced in July 1992 when four Tornado F3s arrived in the Falklands. 

No. 1435 Flight re-equipped with the Eurofighter Typhoon FGR4 in September 2009, when ZJ944, ZJ949, ZJ950 and ZK301 arrived from RAF Coningsby.

Flight home stations 

 RAF Ta Kali 
 RAF Luqa (1942)
 RAF Stanley (1983 – 1985)
 RAF Mount Pleasant (1988 – present)

Aircraft operated
Aircraft operated by No. 1435 Flight.

 Hawker Hurricane Mk.IIb / Mk.IIc (December 1941 – June 1942)
 Bristol Beaufighter Mk.I (August 1942 – April 1945)
 Hawker Siddeley Harrier GR.3 (1983 – 1985)
 McDonnell Douglas Phantom FGR.2 (November 1988 – 1992)
 Panavia Tornado F3 (1992 – September 2009)
 Eurofighter Typhoon FGR4 (September 2009 – present)

Heritage and traditions

Motto 
The Flight goes by the motto of "Protect the Right" while the motto of the Falkland Islands is "Desire the Right".

Maltese heritage 
The Flight has maintained its Maltese connections, with its aircraft sporting the Maltese cross. The practice of naming the four-aircraft presence on the islands has also been maintained: they are called Faith, Hope and Charity, after the legendary three Gloster Sea Gladiators that once defended Malta, and Desperation. Desperation was added to the three traditional names when Phantoms entered service in the Falklands and the flight was revived in 1988. Faith, Hope and Charity fly operationally, with Desperation appropriately in reserve. On their retirement in 1992, one of the Phantoms was placed as the gate guardian at Mount Pleasant. The Phantoms were replaced by four Tornado F.3s. The four Tornados remained in active service until they were replaced in their turn by four Eurofighter Typhoon FGR4s in September 2009. Although the unit's new aircraft do not have the traditional names applied, the four aircraft have tailcodes that match (F, H, C, D).

See also
No. 1312 Flight RAF - Falklands transport aircraft
List of Royal Air Force aircraft squadrons
List of Royal Air Force independent flights
Military of the Falkland Islands

References
Notes

 Citations

Bibliography

External links

Page of Images of 1435 Flight's Tornado F.3s
, uploaded 18 January 2007.

1435 Flight
1435 Squadron
Military units and formations established in 1941
Military units and formations of the Royal Air Force in World War II